Elk Island Provincial Park is a provincial park in Manitoba, Canada.

History
Elk Island Provincial Park was designated under the Provincial Parks Act by the Government of Manitoba in 1974. The area was protected between 1970 and 1974 as part of nearby Grand Beach Provincial Park. 

An island labelled "Isle aux Biches" appears in this approximate location in a 1775 map made by Christopher Dufrost de La Jemeraye from explorations led by La Verendrye.<ref name="GOM-MgmtPlan"/

Elk Island is listed as one of several locations used during fall harvesting of fish from Lake Winnipeg shortly after the creation of Manitoba as a province of Canada in 1870. 

Faith Bible Camp, a children's summer camp was established on the island in 1954. The camp was moved to a new location on Sandy Bay in 1969 prior to the island becoming part of Grand Beach Provincial Park.

See also
List of protected areas of Manitoba

External Links
Elk Island Provincial Park on iNaturalist

References

Provincial parks of Manitoba

Parks in Eastman Region, Manitoba
Protected areas of Manitoba